Collina is genus of ammonite that lived during lower to upper Toarcian stage of early Jurassic. Members of this genus existed from Braunianus Subzone to Variabilis Zone. Their fossils were found in Europe, Asia, North America and South America. It has evolved from Mesodactylites.

Description
Whorl section is angular quadrate. Distant ribs can be bifurcating or trifurcating on the place of high ventrolateral tubercules. Secondary ribs are bent strongly forward and raised in the middle part of the venter. Size dimorphism is present in the case of this genus.

References

Dactylioceratidae
Toarcian life
Early Jurassic ammonites of Europe
Ammonites of Asia
Ammonites of North America
Ammonites of South America
Ammonitida genera